Gil Marquez is a hamlet of the municipality of Almonaster la Real, in Andalusia (Spain), with 73 inhabitants. It is 8 kilometres from Almonaster.

Economy 

Its inhabitants are agriculturalist and ranchers.

Monuments 

Bridge of Las Tres Fuentes
Church of "El Carmen".

Local celebration 

Local festival of "El Carmen" in July.

Environs 

Spa el Manzano
Arroyo el Moro

Populated places in the Province of Huelva